Mykhailo Kasalo (also known as Mikhail Kasalo from ; born 24 November 1989) is a Ukrainian former competitive ice dancer. With former partner Nadezhda Frolenkova, he won bronze medals at the 2011 Winter Universiade, 2008 Golden Spin of Zagreb and two ISU Junior Grand Prix events, and placed as high as 13th at the European Championships, in 2011.

Programs 
(with Frolenkova)

Competitive highlights
(with Frolenkova)

References

External links 

 

Ukrainian male ice dancers
Figure skaters at the 2007 Winter Universiade
1989 births
Living people
Sportspeople from Kharkiv
Universiade medalists in figure skating
Universiade bronze medalists for Ukraine
Competitors at the 2009 Winter Universiade